Banksia foliolata is a species of shrub that is endemic to Western Australia. It has hairy stems, pinnatifid leaves, heads of about sixty cream-coloured and maroon flowers and oblong to elliptical follicles. It grows on rocky slopes in dense shrubland in the Stirling Range National Park.

Description
Banksia foliolata is a shrub that typically grows to a height of  but does not form a lignotuber. There are between ten and thirty-five egg-shaped lobes on each side of the leaves. The flowers are borne on a head containing between fifty and sixty flowers.

Taxonomy and naming
This banksia was first formally described in 1830 by Robert Brown who gave it the name Dryandra foliolata and published the description in Supplementum primum Prodromi florae Novae Hollandiae from specimens collected by William Baxter near King George's Sound in 1829. In 2007, Austin Mast and Kevin Thiele changed the name to Banksia foliolata. The specific epithet (foliolata) from a Latin word meaning "leaved" or "leafy".

Distribution and habitat
Banksia foliolata grows on rocky slopes in dense shrubland in the Stirling Range National Park.

Conservation status
This banksia is classified as "Priority Four" by the Government of Western Australia Department of Parks and Wildlife, meaning that is rare or near threatened.

References

 

foliolata
Endemic flora of Western Australia
Plants described in 1830
Taxa named by Robert Brown (botanist, born 1773)
Taxa named by Kevin Thiele